The Deming Armory (formerly known as the State Armory, now also known as the Deming Luna Mimbres Museum) is a historic armory in the United States, located at 301 South Silver Avenue in Deming, Luna County, New Mexico.  The building was built for the United States Department of the Army in 1915–16, and is currently being used as the premises for the local museum in Deming.   The armory was added to the New Mexico State Register of Cultural Properties in 1978 and was listed on the National Register of Historic Places in 1983.

History
The building, designed by architect Henry C. Trost, was originally constructed as a National Guard armory. The building was the first armory to be built after New Mexico became a state in 1912.  It was constructed to train soldiers to guard the border with Mexico during the ongoing Mexican Revolution.

The armory served the New Mexico National Guard for 60 years.  The building housed a chapter of the USO during World War II, in support of the men training at Deming Army Airfield. During the years that the building served as a military facility, it was also used as a community center for hosting dances, basketball games and other local events.

Two events in 1976 contributed towards the launch of a campaign to acquire the Deming Armory as new premises for the town's museum.  First, the National Guard vacated the building and moved to a new facility on the south side of Deming.  Second, a local businessman, Hubert Ruebush, offered to donate his mother's old electric washing machine, the first such washer in Deming, to the museum.  When Ruebush learned that the museum could not accommodate the washer in its cramped facilities, he donated $6000 to acquire the armory on the condition that his donation be matched through local fundraising.  Ruebush's condition was quickly satisfied, and a delegation from Deming subsequently negotiated a selling price of $11,500 for the building with the State Armory Board in Santa Fe.

Architecture
The Deming Armory is an imposing red-brick building, two stories in height and resting on a raised basement. It comprises three bays along the front elevation, with a depth of nine bays, and pilasters divide the side elevations. The facade is characterized by decorative brickwork, concrete detailing, and a large central arch leading to double-leaf doors.

Deming Luna Mimbres Museum
The Deming Luna Mimbres Museum, also known as the Deming Luna County Museum, is operated by the Luna County Historical Society.  The museum's exhibits focus on the everyday lives and history of area residents.  Collections include Mimbres pottery, dolls and toys, glass, china, crystal, teapots, silver, copper and Depression glass, and saddles and ranching equipment.  Other exhibits include period rooms, furniture, paintings, tools, clothes, Native American artifacts, gems and geodes, weapons, war memorabilia, vehicles and farm equipment.

See also
National Register of Historic Places listings in Luna County, New Mexico

References

External links
Deming Luna Mimbres Museum - Luna County Historical Society

Armories on the National Register of Historic Places in New Mexico
Government buildings completed in 1916
History museums in New Mexico
Museums in Luna County, New Mexico
National Register of Historic Places in Luna County, New Mexico
New Mexico State Register of Cultural Properties
Trost & Trost buildings